El Pino & the Volunteers  is a band from Rotterdam, The Netherlands. The band's music mixes alt. rock with Americana. In 2006 the band's debut album Molten City  was released on Excelsior Recordings.

Biography
During an exchange project in Vancouver, David Pino, singer of Wiseguy, met two Canadians who introduced him to alternative country. In exchange for a six-pack of beer and a tank full of gasoline, Pino obtained an acoustic guitar. Together with his Canadian accomplices, he traveled across the country playing for cash or free beers. Back in the Netherlands, he brought together like-minded musicians, and El Pino & the Volunteers was born. The band got together only every once in a while, and concerts were held on an incidental basis.

After a couple of months of playing, the band started to become more serious. This newfound professionalism was solidified with the band's first EP Cougar. It was released in May 2005 by the small record label Stardumb. The EP sold out in no-time and received much praise in the Dutch music press.

In December 2005, MTV aired a special on the band in its Brand New show. Pino decided to leave his main band Wiseguy to focus completely on El Pino & the Volunteers.

In early 2006, the band was invited to the prestigious Noorderslag festival in Groningen. The press was enthusiastic, and praised the band for its musicianship (de Volkskrant). Dutch Excelsior Recordings, home of Johan, Daryll-Ann and GEM, signed the band immediately. El Pino & the Volunteers played at Club 3voor12 that February, recorded an Apers song for a tribute album in March, and performed at Motel Mozaique in April. And, in May, the band performed at the 10th anniversary party of Excelsior Recordings, together with several of their labelmates.

In May and June the band recorded 16 tracks for its debut album, which Reyn Ouwehand produced. On August 31, the album, named Molten City, was presented in Rotown in Rotterdam. The album was received well by the music press, becoming album of the week at 3voor12 (link). In September and October the band supported Johan during their Dutch club tour.

The band rounded out the year by performing at the Fine Fine Music tour in December 2006.

The next record, also produced by Reyn Ouwehand, was released November 16, 2009.

Discography

Band members
 David Pino – vocals, lead guitar, acoustics guitar & harmonica
 Mark van der Waarde – bass, backing vocals
 Job Roggeveen – keys
 Tjirk Deurloo – acoustic & electric guitar, backing vocals
 Jeroen Kleijn - drums, percussion

Former band members
 Skip Ross - drums
 Cary Da Costa - lap steel, mandoline, melodica
 Harm Goslink Kuiper – 5-string banjo, dobro / lap steel, mandolin, accordion
 Wouter de Waart – drums, percussion

External links
 Official Website
 MySpace

Dutch musical groups